John Stig Claesson (2 June 1928 – 4 January 2008), also known under his signature Slas, was a Swedish writer, visual artist, and illustrator. Claesson was born on 2 June 1928 in Huddinge, south of Stockholm. He attended the Royal Swedish Academy of Arts between 1947 and 1952, during which time he began to illustrate Swedish literature such as the novels of Per Anders Fogelström. Claesson is the father of actor Leif Claesson. His son, artist Nils Claesson, published a revealing portrait of his father in the book Blåbärsmaskinen (The Blueberry Machine, 2009) which was much discussed in Sweden on its publication. Stig Claesson died on 4 January 2008 in Stockholm.

Career 

Claesson debuted in his writing career in 1956, when he was 28 years of age. During his career Claesson published more than 80 books. A number of his books are based on travel abroad and move in the frontier between reporting and fiction. Among his best-known works include En vandring i solen (Walking in the Sun, 1976), which was made into a film with Gösta Ekman in the role of the main character. Claesson provided works about the remote and rural regions of Sweden and describe the conflict between the town and the country in books such as Vem älskar Yngve Frej (1968; Who Loves Yngve Frej), which was translated into 10 languages and was filmed for television in 1973 starring Allan Edwall. A stage adaption was created in the 1990s. His last book was God Natt Fröken Ann (Goodnight, Miss Ann), published in 2006.

Stig Claesson's work has received many awards, such as the literature prize of the newspaper Svenska Dagbladet and the Selma Lagerlöf Prize. The University of Uppsala awarded him an honorary doctorate degree in 1974.

He died on 4 January 2008.

Bibliography 

 Berättelse från Europa, 1956
 Från Nya världen, 1961
 Supportern, 1962
 Bönder, 1963
 Ugnstekt gädda, 1964
 Västgötalagret, 1965
 En Stockholmsbok, 1966
 Kiki, en liten man, 1966 (foto Yngve Baum)
 Dråp i hastigt mod, 1966
 Lage Lindell, 1966 (Bonniers små konstböcker)
 Flickor, 1967
 Döden heter Konrad, 1967
 I stället för telegram Finland 50 år, tillsammans med Jens Hildén, 1967
 21 Berättelser, 1968
 Vem älskar Yngve Frej, 1968; filmatiserad 1973
 Nelly, 1969
 Den ensamme nobelpristagarens vardag, 1970
 Knut K. Selma Johansson med rätt att leva, 1970
 Sanningen och ingenting annat än, 1970
 Att resa sig upp och gå, 1971
 Samtal på ett fjärrtåg, 1972
 Min vän Charlie (My friend Charlie), 1973
 Yrkesmän emellan, 1974

 Brev till en hembygdsgård, 1974
 Stockholmsbilder, med ill. av Svenolov Ehrén, 1975
 På palmblad och rosor, 1975
 Bättre kan det inte sägas, 1976
 En vandring i solen, 1976 (filmatiserades 1978, se vidare, En vandring i solen)
 Henrietta ska du också glömma, 1977 (filmatiserades 1983, se Henrietta (film))
 Ni har inget liv att försäkra, 1978
 Allt står i lågor, 1979
 Medan tidvattnet vänder, 1980
 Om vänskap funnes, 1981
 Sveaborg eller Rock happy, 1981
 Lika oskyldigt som meningslöst, 1982
 Sagor för barn och vuxna, 1982
 10-årskalendern, 1982 (specialtryck)
 Utsikt från ett staffli, 1983
 I boulevardens skugga, 1983
 Dagarna före lunch, 1984
 De tio budorden, 1984
 Det bortglömda landskapet, 1985
 Blå måndag, 1985
 Lantlif i Budapest, 1986
 Kamrerns julafton, (Bonniers julbok) 1986

 På behörigt avstånd, (teckningar och collage), 1987
 Nya Stockholmsbilder, (ill. Svenolov Ehrén), 1987
 Skam den som fryser, 1987
 21 Sagor, 1988
 Kärlek rostar inte, 1988
 Landet som inte längre finns, 1989
 Iakttagen (målade porträtt), 1989
 Innan himlen klarnar, 1989
 SommarStockholm, (teckningar) 1989
 En mörts drömmar, 1990
 Målade porträtt, 1991
 Yngve Frejs landskap, (pasteller) 1991
 Rosine, 1991
 Skånebilder, (pasteller) 1991
 Han och hon, (sagor) 1992
 Blues för Mr Shelley, 1992
 Män i min ålder 1992
 Nästa man till rakning, 1993
 Nästa Katrineholm, 1993 (specialtryck)
 På landet, 1993
 Årstider och åsikter, 1993
 Vägen till brevlådan, 1993

 Nice Mat Sol, 1994, (med Nils Emil Ahlin)
 Till Europa 1994, (foto Leif Claesson)
 Den extra milen, 1994
 Eko av en vår, 1996
 Vandring med mig själv, 1996
 Blå stolar, 1996
 Man måste det man önskar, 1997
 Vad man ser och hedrar, 1998
 Varsel om kommande tilldragelse, 1999
 Svart asfalt grönt gräs, 2000
 Det lyckliga Europa, 2001
 Efter oss syndafloden, 2002
 Följ Alltid Cecilias Exempel, 2003
 Sov du så diskar jag, 2004
 Liv och kärlek, 2005
 Sekonderna lämnar ringen, 2005
 God natt fröken Ann, 2006

Claesson also wrote the television show Harry H - Fallet Mary (Directed by Jan Halldoff), which was originally aired on Swedish TV 2 in 1978.

References 

Swedish illustrators
Swedish-language writers
1928 births
2008 deaths
Selma Lagerlöf Prize winners